Parekhi is a Georgian medieval Orthodox monastery in historical Medieval Georgian Kingdom of Klarjeti (modern-day Artvin Province of Turkey).

The monastery is an illustration of the activity of St. Gregory's followers. Founded in 840s as a hermitage, it soon turned into a coenobium. Monastic buildings are sheltered by a horizontal ledge and form an organic whole with the surrounding landscape. Two ninth-century churches, a single-nave structure and a basilica, stand in the middle of the monastery next to each other.

References

External links 

 Virtualtao-klarjeti.com - Parekhi.

Christian monasteries established in the 9th century
History of Artvin Province
Georgian churches in Turkey
Georgian Orthodox monasteries
Ruined churches in Turkey
Eastern Orthodox monasteries in Turkey
Buildings and structures in Artvin Province